Melbourne Cup Challenge (also known as Frankie Dettori Racing in Europe) is a horse racing simulation video game based on the Melbourne Cup. It was developed by Sidhe Interactive and was published by Tru Blu Entertainment. The game was released in Australia and New Zealand on 26 October 2006 and 8 December 2006 for Europe. It was released for PlayStation 2, Xbox and Microsoft Windows.

Features 
Multiplayer online play for all platforms, allowing competitive and friendly play over the Internet. Multiple game modes including, career mode, jockey challenge, betting party. In depth Career Mode including auctions, horse breeding, training, and stable management. Highly detailed graphics including realistic horses and jockeys, weather effects, and accurately modeled international race courses. Lifelike horse and jockey animation, motion captured by Weta Digital, the VFX wizards behind The Lord of the Rings movie trilogy.

External links 
Sidhe Interactive Website
 
 
CHRA Online Racing Association website
Home Entertainment Suppliers website
SCA Sound Studios website

2006 video games
Horse racing video games
Melbourne Cup
PlayStation 2 games
Video games developed in New Zealand
Video games set in Australia
Windows games
Xbox games
Sidhe (company) games
Multiplayer and single-player video games
Tru Blu Entertainment games